The Argentine general election of 1928 was held on 1 April, with a turnout of 80.9%.

Background

Former President Hipólito Yrigoyen's differences with his successor and erstwhile ally, Marcelo Torcuato de Alvear, persuaded him to campaign for the presidency again. Doing so meant overcoming a host of obstacles, however:  his "Antipersonalist" opposition within the UCR, though divided, eroded his allies' majority in Congress from 91 seats (out of 158) to 72 in 1924 and 60 in 1926, and he himself was 78 and in declining health.

These developments encouraged not only the Antipersonalists, but also conservatives, who united behind Julio A. Roca's Rightist Confederation. The Governor of the important Córdoba Province, Roca was the son of General Julio Roca, who had dominated the country politically between 1880 and 1906 and, in the minds of their supporters, recalled a certain nostalgia for the pastoral Argentina of the time. President Alvear's Antipersonalist UCR nominated the leader of the 1924 dissension that created the movement, Senator Leopoldo Melo. Melo underscored the conservative bent of his campaign by naming Senator Vicente Gallo as his running mate; Gallo was a founding member of the paramilitary Argentine Patriotic League, and had resigned as President Alvear's Interior Minister after unsuccessfully lobbying to have a pro-Yrigoyen governor removed.

The Socialists, who vied for the majority in the Buenos Aires City Legislature (but had little following elsewhere), themselves balked at the possibility of victory in 1928 and split during their 1927 convention over Senator Juan B. Justo's intransigent leadership of the party. Senator Justo died suddenly in January 1928, and the party presented two tickets: the Authentic Socialists, led by Congressman Mario Bravo and running only in the City of Buenos Aires, and the more conservative Independent Socialists, led Justo's running-mate, former University of La Plata Director José Nicolás Matienzo.

Election night was a referendum on the charismatic Yrigoyen, as well as on the largely positive memories voters had of 1916—22 term. Yrigoyen had further built on this sentiment by focusing debate in the closing days of the campaign on the future of YPF, thereby presenting himself as its best defense against the oil concern's chief antagonist, Standard Oil. His ticket swept the polls, recovering the majority it enjoyed in the Lower House in the early 1920s (with 53 of 79 seats at stake), and winning 5 of 10 contested Senate seats. His faction won majorities in all major districts: the City of Buenos Aires, and in Buenos Aires, Córdoba and Santa Fe Provinces (the latter two had been in opposition hands since 1920 and 1918, respectively). Mendoza Province, which remained in the reformist former Governor Carlos Washington Lencinas' Dissident UCR column, continued to be denied its two senators by the body, itself.

Bravo's Authentic Socialists lost to Matienzo's splinter ticket (though only an endorsement by San Juan Governor Federico Cantoni gave the latter 3 electoral votes). Roca's Unified Front, which lost in their home province of Córdoba, had endorsed the Antipersonalist UCR Melo-Gallo ticket, and pledged their 20 electors to the latter in a symbolic alliance. Minor and provincial parties, for their part, opted instead to abstain from casting most of their combined 84 electoral votes, thereby creating the largest such deficit in the history of the Argentine Electoral College (abolished in 1994 by the constitutional convention held that year). Yrigoyen's running mate, Francisco Beiró, died before taking office, and Córdoba Governor Enrique Martínez was elected to the post by the electoral college. Yrigoyen was sworn in on October 12, 1928.

Candidates
 Radical Civic Union (populist): Former President Hipólito Yrigoyen of the city of Buenos Aires
 Antipersonalist Radical Civic Union/United Front (center-right): Senator Leopoldo Melo of Entre Ríos Province
 Socialist Party: Senator Mario Bravo of Tucumán Province
 Independent Socialist Party: Former Minister of Labor José Nicolás Matienzo of Buenos Aires Province

Results

President

Chamber of Deputies

References

1928
1928 elections in South America
1928 in Argentina
1928